Les Estivants is a French drama film directed by Valeria Bruni Tedeschi. It premiered at the 75th Venice International Film Festival.

Plot
Anna, a recently separated film director, goes with her daughter to her mother's large and beautiful property on the French Riviera for a few days vacation. In the midst of her family, friends, and employees, Anna must manage both her break-up and the writing of her new film. She will not necessarily be listened to and helped.

Cast
 Valeria Bruni Tedeschi as Anna
 Pierre Arditi as Jean
 Valeria Golino as Elena
 Noémie Lvovsky as Nathalie
 Yolande Moreau as Jacqueline
 Laurent Stocker as Stanislas
 Riccardo Scamarcio as Luca
 Bruno Raffaelli as Bruno
 Marisa Borini as Louisa
 Oumy Bruni Garrel as Célia
 Guilaine Londez as Pauline
 Vincent Perez as The Swiss actor
 Stefano Cassetti as The brother of Anna
 Xavier Beauvois as The producer
 Frederick Wiseman as CNC Member

Production
Principal photography on the film began in August 2017 in Paris.

Year-end lists 
 Best "sleepers" (not ranked) – Dennis King, Tulsa World

References

External links
 

2018 films
2018 drama films
French drama films
2010s French-language films
Films directed by Valeria Bruni Tedeschi
2010s French films